Barshin  is a Syrian village located in Ayn Halaqim Nahiyah in Masyaf District, Hama.  According to the Syria Central Bureau of Statistics (CBS), Barshin had a population of 1,155 in the 2004 census. Its inhabitants are predominantly Christians.

References

Bibliography

 

Populated places in Masyaf District
Christian communities in Syria